Wayne Sorensen (born July 8, 1963 in Calgary, Alberta) is a Canadian sport shooter. He competed in rifle shooting events at the Summer Olympics in 1992 and 2000.

Olympic results

References

1963 births
Living people
Canadian male sport shooters
ISSF rifle shooters
Olympic shooters of Canada
Pan American Games medalists in shooting
Shooters at the 1992 Summer Olympics
Shooters at the 2000 Summer Olympics
Sportspeople from Calgary
Commonwealth Games medallists in shooting
Commonwealth Games gold medallists for Canada
Commonwealth Games silver medallists for Canada
Pan American Games silver medalists for Canada
Pan American Games bronze medalists for Canada
Shooters at the 1999 Pan American Games
Shooters at the 1994 Commonwealth Games
Shooters at the 1998 Commonwealth Games
Medalists at the 1999 Pan American Games
20th-century Canadian people
Medallists at the 1994 Commonwealth Games
Medallists at the 1998 Commonwealth Games